Vassbygda may refer to the following locations:

Vassbygda, Nordland, a village in Brønnøy municipality, Nordland, Norway
Vassbygda, Nord-Trøndelag, a village in Stjørdal municipality, Nord-Trøndelag, Norway
Vassbygda, Agdenes, a village in Agdenes municipality, Sør-Trøndelag, Norway
Vassbygda, Skaun, a village in Skaun municipality, Sør-Trøndelag, Norway